Entosphenus is a genus of lampreys.

Species
Seven species in this genus are recognized:
 Entosphenus folletti Vladykov & Kott, 1976 (Modoc brook lamprey)
 Entosphenus hubbsi Vladykov & Kott, 1976 (Kern brook lamprey)
 Entosphenus lethophagus (C. L. Hubbs, 1971) (Pit-Klamath brook lamprey)
 Entosphenus macrostomus (Beamish, 1982) (Vancouver lamprey)
 Entosphenus minimus (C. E. Bond & T. T. Kan, 1973) (Miller Lake lamprey)
 Entosphenus similis Vladykov & Kott, 1979 (Klamath river lamprey)
 Entosphenus tridentatus (J. Richardson, 1836) (Pacific lamprey)

References

Petromyzontidae
Jawless fish genera
Taxa named by Theodore Gill